Eremophila subfloccosa, also known as dense-felted eremophila is a plant in the figwort family, Scrophulariaceae and is endemic to Australia.  It is a shrub which often has foliage covered with soft hairs, giving the plant a silvery grey hue and making it soft to touch. The leaves are strongly scented when crushed. Its flowers are usually greenish yellow in colour and have the stamens protruding from the ends. Dense-felted eremophila is common after fire, but becomes less so as others recover and compete with it.

Description
The leaves and branches are often densely covered, usually with more than one kind of soft hairs making the foliage soft to touch, although there is variation between subspecies. The foliage is often strongly scented when crushed.

They are not spotted and the four stamens extend beyond the tube formed by the petals.

Taxonomy and naming
Eremophila subfloccosa was first formally described by George Bentham in 1870 in Flora Australiensis. The specific epithet (subfloccosa) is from the Latin sub meaning "somewhat" or "almost" and floccosus, "floccose" referring to the stem and leaf hairs.

Three subspecies have been recognised:

The epithet glandulosa is from Latin, meaning 'covered with hairs bearing glandular tips' and the epithet lanata is from the Latin 'covered with long dense curled and matted hairs'.

Distribution
Eremophila subfloccosa occurs in semi-arid parts of Western Australia and in South Australia, mainly near the Eyre Peninsula. It grows in a range of soils, often near saline areas and on disturbed sites such as road verges. It often thrives after bushfire but suffers in competition from others as they recover after several years.

Subspecies subfloccosa grows in sandy soils or laterite in disturbed areas between Hyden and Wongan Hills in the Avon Wheatbelt,  and Yalgoo biogeographic regions. 
Subspecies glandulosa occurs in two disjunct populations. In Western Australia it occurs between Balladonia and Ravensthorpe in the Coolgardie, Esperance Plains and Mallee biogeographic regions. It is often found after bushfires and near roadsides whilst absent from nearby undisturbed bush. In South Australia it occurs in the Yorke Peninsula, Northern Lofty, Murray and Southern Lofty botanical regions.
Subspecies lanata also occurs in two disjunct populations in two states. In Western Australia it grows in a broad area between Cue and Rawlinna in the Avon Wheatbelt, Carnarvon, Coolgardie, Esperance Plains, Geraldton Sandplains, Great Victoria Desert, Mallee, Murchison and Yalgoo biogeographic regions and is often found in sandy soils on plains and on the margins of salt lakes. In South Australia it occurs in the North-western, Flinders Ranges, Eyre Peninsula, Yorke Peninsula, South Eastern botanical regions.

Use in horticulture
The soft, silvery foliage of dense-felted eremophila make it a suitable garden plant. It grows best in drier areas, needs full sun and prefers alkaline, well drained soil. Propagation is easier from cutting than from seed but the use of mist will cause fungal problems.

References

subfloccosa
Flora of Western Australia
Flora of South Australia
Plants described in 1870
Taxa named by George Bentham